The Northeastern Huskies represent Northeastern University in the Women's Hockey East Association during the 2016–17 NCAA Division I women's ice hockey season.

Recruiting

Roster

2016–17 Huskies

Schedule

|-
!colspan=12 style="background:black; color:red;"| Regular Season
 
 
 
 
 
 
 
 
 
 
 
 
 
 
 
 
 
 
 
 
 
 
 
 
 
 
 
 
 
 
 
 
 
|-
!colspan=12 style="background:black; color:red;"| WHEA Tournament

Awards and honors
 Brittany Bugalski was named WHEA Goaltender of the month for September, October and November, 2016.

 Denisa Krížová was named WHEA player of the month for January, 2017.

 Hayley Scamurra named 2017 WHEA Best Defensive Forward

 McKenna Brand (Forward) named 2017 WHEA First Team All-Star

 Denisa Krížová (Forward) named 2017 WHEA Second Team All-Star

 Heather Mottau (Defender) named 2017 WHEA Second Team All-Star

References

Northeastern Huskies women's ice hockey seasons
Northeastern